The Savannah Region is a newly proposed region to be created in Ghana. The region will have administrative and governmental legislature like any of the ten already existing regions in Ghana. The region will be carved out of the northern part of the Northern Region. This will be a fulfillment of a campaign promise made by New Patriotic Party. Prior to the 2016 Ghanaian general election, the then candidate Nana Akufo-Addo declared that when elected, he would explore the possibility of creating new regions out of some of the existing regions in Ghana in order to bring government closer to citizens.

The execution of plans for the creation of the regions was seeded to the newly created Ministry of Regional Reorganization and Development which is under the leadership of Hon. Dan Botwe. Government of Ghana ministry charged with the responsibility of supervising the creation of new regions in Ghana. In March 2017, the ministry sent the blue print for the creation of the region along with others to the Council of State. The council met over 36 times from the time of submission to August 2017.

The final stage for the creation of the region will be decided through a referendum by the people within the catchment of the new region.

References 

Regions of Ghana